Moimenta de Maceira Dão is a former civil parish in the municipality of Mangualde, Portugal. In 2013, the parish merged into the new parish Moimenta de Maceira Dão e Lobelhe do Mato.

References

Former parishes of Mangualde